Gilmore Mills is an unincorporated community in Rockbridge County, Virginia, United States.

Annandale and the Varney's Falls Dam were listed on the National Register of Historic Places in 1993.

References

Unincorporated communities in Rockbridge County, Virginia
Unincorporated communities in Virginia